Carmen Antimo Argenziano (October 27, 1943February 9, 2019) was an American actor who appeared in over 73 movies and around 100 television movies or episodes. He was best known for playing Jacob Carter on Stargate SG-1. He had recurring roles on Booker, L.A. Law, Melrose Place, and The Young and the Restless, as well as minor roles in The Godfather Part II, Angels & Demons, and The Accused.

Life and career 
Argenziano was born in Sharon, Pennsylvania, and raised in nearby Sharpsville, the son of parents of Italian descent, Elizabeth Stella (née Falvo) and Joseph Guy Argenziano, who was a restaurateur. He had three children: two sons and a step-daughter.

One of Argenziano's best-known roles was as the recurring character Jacob Carter in the television series Stargate SG-1. He was also a lifetime member of the Actors Studio and was awarded the Los Angeles Drama Critics' Circle Award for his performance as Jack Delasante in Thomas Babe's A Prayer for My Daughter. In 2007, he was cast as one of the potential fellowship candidates in House M.D.—albeit as a fake doctor—but was eliminated. In 2009, he guest-starred in Criminal Minds, episode: "Demonology", where he portrayed Father Paul Silvano.

Argenziano died of lung cancer on February 9, 2019, at the age of 75.

Filmography

Film

Television

References

External links 

 
 
 Selmak.Org ~ Unofficial Fan Site

1943 births
2019 deaths
People from Sharon, Pennsylvania
People from Mercer County, Pennsylvania
Male actors from Pennsylvania
American male film actors
American male television actors
20th-century American male actors
21st-century American male actors
American people of Italian descent